The Sagintayev Cabinet was the 10th cabinet of the Government of Kazakhstan under the leadership of Prime Minister Bakhytzhan Sagintayev. It was formed after Sagintayev's predecessor, Karim Massimov was appointed as a head of the National Security Committee on 8 September 2016. President Nursultan Nazarbayev nominated Sagintayev, who served as the First Deputy under Massimov's government to be the new Prime Minister. He was confirmed by the Parliament the following day on 9 September. Some speculated that Sagintayev was a close ally to Nazarbayev's daughter Dariga, and the reason for a cabinet reshuffle was to make way for Nazarbayev's succession after the neighboring country of Uzbekistan faced a political uncertainty over President Islam Karimov's death which occurred on 2 September.

On 21 February 2019, as a result of growing public dismay, President Nazarbayev dismissed Sagintayev and instead appointed Askar Mamin as the Acting Prime Minister who was approved by the Parliament on 25 February, thus forming a new government.

Composition

References 

Cabinets of Kazakhstan
2016 in Kazakhstan
Cabinets established in 2016
2016 establishments in Kazakhstan